Long Bình is a commune-level town (thị trấn) of the An Phú District of An Giang Province, Vietnam, was established on 12 April 2005.

Geography 

Long Binh is a border town located in the north of An Phu district, geographically located:

To the east, it borders Khanh An commune

To the west and north, it borders Cambodia

To the south, it borders Khanh Binh commune.

In the southwest of Long Binh town, there is the Long Binh - Chrey Thom bridge spanning the Binh Di river connecting the town with Chrey Thom village in Sampeou Poun commune, Koh Thom district, Kandal province, Cambodia.

History 
Long Binh town was established on April 12, 2005 on the basis of 174 hectares of natural area and 4,054 people of Khanh Binh commune, and 248 hectares of natural area and 3,738 people of Khanh An commune.

After its establishment, the town has 422 hectares of natural area and 7,792 people.

Communes of An Giang province
Populated places in An Giang province
Townships in Vietnam